Presidente Bernardes, named after President Arthur Bernardes, may refer to:

Places
Presidente Bernardes, Minas Gerais
Presidente Bernardes, São Paulo

Other
Presidente Bernardes Refinery, a refinery in Cubatão, Brazil